The 1999 Paris–Nice was the 57th edition of the Paris–Nice cycle race and was held from 7 March to 14 March 1999. The race started in Boulogne-Billancourt and finished in Nice. The race was won by Michael Boogerd of the Rabobank team.

General classification

References

1999
1999 in road cycling
1999 in French sport
March 1999 sports events in Europe